Ray Courtemanche Jr. (born February 14, 1970) is a Canadian businessman and stock car racing driver. A veteran of the NASCAR Canadian Tire Series, he raced in the series from 2011 to 2015. He also competed in the NASCAR Camping World Truck Series, driving the No. 07 Chevrolet Silverado for SS-Green Light Racing.

Racing career
Courtemanche began racing in the NASCAR Canadian Tire Series in 2011, competing on a part-time basis. After another limited schedule in 2012, during which he won the series' Most Popular Driver Award, he moved to a full-time slate in 2013 and finished 12th in points. During the 2013 season, he suffered an upper-body injury in a wreck at Canadian Tire Motorsport Park, leading to a brief hospitalisation.

In 2014, his Danam Bonzaï Racing team partnered with Scott Steckly's 22 Racing. In August, Courtemanche made his NASCAR Camping World Truck Series debut at Mosport with SS-Green Light Racing; he had tested a truck with the team at Virginia International Raceway earlier in the month.

Personal life
Courtemanche operates Investissements Ray Junior Inc., a real estate firm that he started at the age of 17. In 2013, he contributed to the creation of La cité de Mirabel with Joe Amendola and Fred Dankoff. In 2019 Joe Amendola and Fred Dankoff severed the business relationship with the race car driver and offered him a lump sum to purchase his shares putting an end to an 8 year association. Courtemanche net worth is estimated at $1 Million - $3 Million. La Cité de Mirabel, a real estate project located near Quebec Autoroute 15.

Motorsports career results

NASCAR
(key) (Bold – Pole position awarded by qualifying time. Italics – Pole position earned by points standings or practice time. * – Most laps led.)

Camping World Truck Series

K&N Pro Series East

Pinty's Series

References

External links
 

1970 births
Living people
Canadian racing drivers
Sportspeople from Montreal
Racing drivers from Quebec
NASCAR drivers